The Dominican Republic competed at the 2004 Summer Olympics in Athens, Greece, from 13 to 29 August 2004. Francia Jackson was chosen to be the flag bearer at the games instead of the previous chosen athlete Félix Sánchez, who won the nation's first ever Olympic gold medal.

Medalists

Athletics 

Dominican Republic athletes have so far achieved qualifying standards in the following athletics events (up to a maximum of 3 athletes in each event at the 'A' Standard, and 1 at the 'B' Standard).

Men
Track & road events

Women
Field events

Boxing

Judo

Men

Shooting 

Men

Table tennis

Taekwondo

Volleyball

Indoor

Women's tournament

Roster

Group play

Weightlifting

Wrestling 

Men's Greco-Roman

See also
 Dominican Republic at the 2003 Pan American Games
 Dominican Republic at the 2004 Summer Paralympics

References

External links
Official Report of the XXVIII Olympiad
Dominican Republic Olympic Committee 

Nations at the 2004 Summer Olympics
2004
Summer Olympics